Cécile Haussernot (born 22 October 1998) is a French chess player holding the title of Woman International Master (WIM). She was twice European champion in her age girls category.

Career 
Haussernot learned how to move the pieces at the age of five, and was invited to play on her club's team at the age of six and then learned the basics. She is a six-time French youth champion: U-8 Girls 2006, U-10 Girls 2007, U-14 Girls 2008, U-14 Girls 2011, U-16 Girls 2013 and U-20 2018. 
She became also French vice-champion in the U-16 Girls category in 2009 and finished 3rd in the U-12 Boys category at the 2010 French youth championships.

Haussernot won two gold medals at the European Youth Chess Championships, in the U-10 Girls section in 2007 at Šibenik, Croatia and in the U-12 Girls section in 2009 at Fermo, Italy. She took the bronze medal in the U-12 Girls category at Batumi, Georgia in 2010. 
In the World Youth Chess Championships, she finished fourth in the U-10 Girls section in 2008 in Vũng Tàu, Vietnam.

In August 2017, Haussernot finished second in the French women's championship. The next month, she played for the silver medal-winning French team in the Women's Mitropa Cup in Balatonszárszó, Hungary. In October, Haussernot finished fourth in the European ACP Women's Blitz Chess Championship in Monte Carlo, behind Alexandra Kosteniuk, Kateryna Lagno and Valentina Gunina respectively.
She finished second in the French Woman's Rapid Championships in 2018 in Angoulême. The same year, she earned a Woman Grandmaster norm in Salento, Italy, in May 2018. She then represented France in the Olympiads in Batumi, in October 2018.
In December 2020, she became French Woman Rapid Champion.

References

External links

1998 births
Living people
Chess Woman International Masters
French female chess players
Place of birth missing (living people)